Allan R. Wagner (6 January 1934 - 28 September 2018) was an American experimental psychologist and learning theorist, whose work focused upon the basic determinants of associative learning and habituation. He co-authored the influential Rescorla–Wagner model of Pavlovian conditioning (1972) as well as the Standard Operating Procedures or "Sometimes Opponent Process" (SOP) theory of associative learning (1981), the Affective Extension of SOP (AESOP, 1989) and the Replaced Elements Model (REM) of configural representation (2001, 2008). His research involved extensive study of the conditioned eyeblink response of the rabbit, of which he was one of the initial investigators (1964).

Wagner received his Ph.D. from the University of Iowa in 1959, under Kenneth W. Spence, and he was on the faculty of Yale University until his death, serving as Chair of the Department of Psychology from 1983–1989, Chair of the Department of Philosophy from 1991–1993, Director of the Division of the Social Sciences from 1992–1998, and in his last years the James Rowland Angell Professor Emeritus of Psychology.

Wagner's scientific contributions were recognized by his receipt of the Howard Crosby Warren Medal of the Society of Experimental Psychologists (1991), the Distinguished Scientific Contribution Award of the American Psychological Association (1999), the W. Horsley Gantt Medal of the Pavlovian Society (2009), the William James Lifetime Achievement Award of the Association for Psychological Science (2013), and election to membership in the National Academy of Sciences (1999).

Selected publications
 Logan, F.A., & Wagner, A.R. (1965). Reward and punishment. Boston: Allyn and Bacon.
 Wagner, A.R., Logan, F.A., Haberlandt, K., & Price, T. (1968). Stimulus selection in animal discrimination learning. Journal of Experimental Psychology, 76, 171-180.
 Wagner, A.R. (1969). Frustrative nonreward: A variety of punishment. In B.A. Campbell & R.M. Church (eds.), Punishment and aversive behavior (pp. 157– 181). New York: Appleton-Century-Crofts.
 Wagner, A.R. (1969). Stimulus selection and a "modified continuity theory." In G.H. Bower & J.T. Spence (Eds.), The psychology of learning and motivation Vol. 3 (pp. 1–41). New York: Academic Press.
 Wagner, A.R., & Rescorla, R.A. (1972). Inhibition in Pavlovian conditioning: Application of a theory. In R.A. Boakes & M.S. Halliday (Eds.), Inhibition and learning (pp. 301–336). London: Academic Press.
 Rescorla, R.A., & Wagner, A.R. (1972). A theory of Pavlovian conditioning: Variations in the effectiveness of reinforcement and nonreinforcement. In A.H. Black & W.F. Prokasy (Eds.), Classical conditioning II: Current theory and research (pp. 64–99). New York: Appleton-Century-Crofts.
 Wagner, A.R. (1978). Expectancies and the priming of STM. In S.H. Hulse, H. Fowler, & W.K. Honig (Eds.), Cognitive processes in animal behavior (pp. 177–209). Hillsdale, NJ: Erlbaum.
 Wagner, A.R. (1981). SOP: A model of automatic memory processing in animal behavior. In N.E. Spear & R.R. Miller (Eds.), Information processing in animals: Memory mechanisms (pp. 5–47). Hillsdale, NJ: Erlbaum.
 Wagner, A.R., & Brandon, S.E. (1989). Evolution of a structured connectionist model of Pavlovian conditioning (ÆSOP). In S.B. Klein and R.R. Mowrer (Eds.), Contemporary learning theories: Pavlovian conditioning and the status of traditional learning theories. (pp. 149–189). Hillsdale, NJ: Erlbaum.
 Wagner, A. R., & Donegan, N. (1989). Some relationships between a computational model (SOP) and an essential neural circuit for Pavlovian (rabbit eyeblink) conditioning. In R. D. Hawkins and G. H. Bower (Eds.), Computational models of learning in simple neural systems: The psychology of learning and motivation, Vol. 23. (pp. 157–203). New York: Academic Press.
 Wagner, A.R., & Brandon, S.E., (2001) A componential theory of Pavlovian Conditioning. In R.R. Mowrer and S.B. Klien (Eds.) Handbook of Contemporary Learning Theories (pp. 23–64) Mahwah, NJ. Erlbaum.
 Wagner, A.R. (2008). Evolution of an elemental theory of Pavlovian conditioning. Learning and Behavior. 36, 253-265.
 Wagner, A.R., & Vogel, E. H. (2010) Associative modulation of US processing: Implications for understanding of habituation. In N. Schmajuk (Ed.) Computational models of associative learning. pp. 150–185, Cambridge: Cambridge University Press.
 Vogel, E.H., Ponce, F.P., & Wagner, A.R. (2017). A theoretical analysis of transfer of occasion setting: SOP with Replaced Elements. Behavioural Processes, 137, 19-32.
 Vogel, E.H., Ponce, F.P., & Wagner, A.R. (2018). The development and present status of the SOP model of associative learning. Quarterly Journal of Experimental Psychology.

Scientific Societies: Offices and Recognitions

 AAAS: Fellow (1971), Electorate Nominating Committee (1985–88), Council Delegate (1988-91)
 Eastern Psychological Association: Board of Directors (1985-1988)
 Society for Quantitative Analysis of Behavior: Secretary (1983–92)
 Society of Experimental Psychologists: Fellow (1972), Howard Crosby Warren Medalist (1991)
 American Psychological Assoc.: Fellow (1968); Distinguished Scientific Contribution Award (1999)
 National Academy of Sciences: Member (1992)
 Society for Computational Models of Associative Learning:Founding Member, Contribution Award (2009)
 The Pavlovian Society: W. Horsley Gantt Medalist (2009)
 Association for Psychological Science: Fellow (1988); William James Lifetime Achievement Award (2013)

References

External links
 Allan R. Wagner webpage at Yale

1934 births
2018 deaths
Yale University faculty
People from Springfield, Illinois
20th-century American psychologists
Members of the United States National Academy of Sciences
Experimental psychologists
Fellows of the American Association for the Advancement of Science
Fellows of the American Psychological Association
Fellows of the Society of Experimental Psychologists
Fellows of the Association for Psychological Science